Maud Welzen (born 13 November 1993) is a Dutch model and former Victoria Secret Angel. She currently resides in New York, and has been married to Bram Aarts since 31 August 2019.

Career

Welzen was discovered in Paris while on a school trip at the age of 13. She started her career in 2010, and has walked for Moschino, Victoria's Secret, Chanel, Burberry, Vera Wang, Alexander McQueen, Valentino SpA, Viktor & Rolf, Michael Kors, Monique Lhuillier, Dolce & Gabbana, and Giambattista Valli.

At their 2012 fashion show, she walked for PINK, the younger Victoria's Secret line. She walked again at the Victoria's Secret Fashion Shows 2014 and 2015.

Personal life 
Welzen married Bram Aarts at Châtau St. Gerlach in Limburg on 31 August 2019, after becoming engaged just over four months previously on 18 April 2019. The wedding was attending by numerous of Welzen's Dutch model colleagues and friends, including Romee Strijd, Sanne Vloet, Julia van Os and Daphne Groeneveld.

References

External links
Maud Welzen on Twitter
Portfolio at Elite Models

1993 births
Dutch female models
Living people
People from Beek